The 2007 Greek Cup Final was the 63rd final of the Greek Cup. The match took place on 5 May 2007 at Panthessaliko Stadium, for the first time. The contesting teams were Panathinaikos and AEL. It was Panathinaikos' twenty sixth Greek Cup Final in their 99 years of existence and AEL's fourth Greek Cup Final in their 43-year history. AEL's defender Stelios Venetidis won the cup with a third different club in his career, after PAOK in 2001 and Olympiacos in 2005 and 2006.

Venue

This was the first Greek Cup Final held at the Panthessaliko Stadium.

The Panthessaliko Stadium was built in 2004. The stadium is used as a venue for Niki Volos. Its current capacity is 22,700.

Background
Panathinaikos had reached the Greek Cup Final twenty five times, winning sixteen of them. The last time that had played in a Final was in 2004, where they had won Olympiacos by 3–1.

AEL had reached the Greek Cup Final three times, winning one of them. The last time that had played in a Final was in 1985, where they had won PAOK by 4–1.

Route to the final

Match

Details

See also
2006–07 Greek Football Cup

References

2007
Cup Final
Greek Cup Final 2007
Greek Cup Final 2007
Sport in Volos
May 2007 sports events in Europe